Vemuri Gaggayya (1895–1955) was an Indian actor, singer, and thespian known for his works in Telugu cinema, and Telugu theatre.  In 1933, East India Film Company produced its first Indian film, Savitri in Telugu. Shot in Calcutta on a budget of 75,000 and based on a popular stage play by Mylavaram Bala Bharathi Nataka Samajam, the film was directed by the father of the "Telugu Theater Movement", Chittajallu Pullayya, casting Vemuri Gaggayya and Dasari Ramathilakam as "Yama" and "Savithri" respectively. The blockbuster film has received an honorary diploma at Venice Film Festival.

Gaggayya was an important member of the "Mylavarama Bala Bharathi Nataka Samajam" in Mylavaram, Krishna district during 1913–28. Through "Mylavaram Theatre", Gaggayya became a household name for mythological roles. He won recognition in drama as Yama, God of death, in Sati Savitri, as the demon Hiranyakasipu in Bhakta Prahlada. Some other prominent roles were as the eponymous Mymvana, and as Jalandhara in Sati Tulasi. His theatrical performances made C. Pullayya to persuade to him to enter motion picture. His other notable films include works such as Kamsa in Sri Krishna Leelalu (1935) and the womanizer in Chandika (1940). He is known for rendering songs such as "Po Bala Pommikan" and "Dhikkaramulu Saituna".

Early life
Gaggayya was born in 1895 at Vemuru in Guntur district, Andhra Pradesh. He lost his father in early childhood. His elder brother tried to educate him but failed in his efforts. He married Ramalaxmi in 1913. During those days, Surabhi Drama company used to be played throughout the Andhra Pradesh and attracts huge crowds. Influenced by this, he learned music and singing songs. He joined the same troupe and acted in many plays touring with them.

Personal life
His son Vemuri Ramaiah was also a stage actor.

Death
Vemuri Gaggayya died in 1955 on 30 December in his native village Vemuru.

Filmography
 Savithri (1933) – Yama
 Seeta Kalyanam (1934)
 Sri Krishna Leelalu (1935) – Kamsa
 Draupadi Vastrapaharanam (1936) – Sisupala
 Sati Tulasi (1936)
 Mohini Rugmangada (1937)
 Jarasandha (1938)
 Bhakta Markandeya (1938) – Yama
 Chandika (1940) – Giriraju
 Mahiravana (1940) – Mairavana
 Dakshayagnam (1941) – Daksha
 Bhakta Prahlada (1942) – Hiranyakashipu
 Seeta Rama Jananam (1942) – Ravana
 Garuda Garvabhangam (1943)

References

External links
 

1895 births
1955 deaths
Telugu male actors
Indian male stage actors
20th-century Indian male actors
Male actors from Andhra Pradesh
People from Guntur district
Andhra University alumni
Indian male film actors
Male actors in Telugu theatre